Johnny Muñoz Jr (born February 16, 1993) is an American mixed martial artist who competes in the Bantamweight division of the Ultimate Fighting Championship.

Background
With his parents founding the BJJ school CQuence Jiu Jitsu in Norco, California, Muñoz started training at five years old, having to train at least two times a week, eventually earning his black belt in BJJ from his mother and father at the age of 20.

In addition to being a fighter, Muñoz went to college and received his master’s degree in 2020.

Mixed martial arts career

Early career
Johnny began his amateur MMA career in 2014 after competing across various BJJ organizations, compiling a 3-0 record, finishing all his bouts in the first round. After going  pro the next year, Muñoz  captured his biggest title in Jiu Jitsu in 2016, winning the SJJIF title in his weight class. Muñoz would spend his whole pro career before the UFC with King of the Cage, going 9-0 and winning the KOTC Bantamweight Championship against Rentsen Otgontulga.

Ultimate Fighting Championship
Muñoz, as a replacement for Ray Borg, faced Nate Maness on August 1, 2020 at UFC Fight Night: Brunson vs. Shahbazyan. He lost the close bout via unanimous decision. 5 out of 15 media scores gave it to Muñoz, 6 out of 10 gave it to Maness, and 4 scored it a draw.

In his sophomore performance, Muñoz bounced back from his lost, defeating Jamey Simmons by the way of unanimous decision on August 7, 2021 at UFC 265.

Muñoz faced Tony Gravely on June 4, 2022, at UFC Fight Night: Volkov vs. Rozenstruik. He lost the bout in the first round after getting knocked down after running into an uppercut on a takedown attempt.

Muñoz faced Liudvik Sholinian on November 5, 2022 at UFC Fight Night 214. He won the bout via unanimous decision.

Championships and accomplishments
King of the Cage
KOTC Bantamweight Championship (One time)

Mixed martial arts record

|-
|Win
|align=center|12–2
|Liudvik Sholinian
|Decision (unanimous)
|UFC Fight Night: Rodriguez vs. Lemos
|
|align=center|3
|align=center|5:00
|Las Vegas, Nevada, United States
|
|-
|Loss
|align=center|11–2
|Tony Gravely
|KO (punches)
|UFC Fight Night: Volkov vs. Rozenstruik
|
|align=center|1
|align=center|1:08
|Las Vegas, Nevada, United States
| 
|-
|Win
|align=center|11–1
|Jamey Simmons
|Submission (rear-naked choke)
|UFC 265
|
|align=center| 2
|align=center| 2:35
|Houston, Texas, United States
|
|-
|Loss
|align=center|10–1
|Nate Maness
|Decision (unanimous)
|UFC Fight Night: Brunson vs. Shahbazyan
|
|align=center|3
|align=center|5:00
|Las Vegas, Nevada, United States
|
|-
|Win
|align=center|10–0
|Ian King
|Submission (rear-naked choke)
|KOTC: Reaction Time
|
|align=center|2
|align=center|3:33
|Parker, Arizona, United States
|
|-
|Win
|align=center| 9–0
|Rentsen Otgontulga
|Decision (unanimous)
|KOTC: Golden Era
|
|align=center| 5
|align=center| 5:00
|Ontario, California, United States
|
|-
|Win
|align=center| 8–0
|Uriel Cossio Dominguez
|Submission (rear-naked choke)
|KOTC: Full Speed
|
|align=center| 2
|align=center| 1:59
|Alpine, California, United States
|
|-
|Win
|align=center| 7–0
|Anthony Zender
|KO
|KOTC: Grand Finale
|
|align=center| 1
|align=center| 0:38
|Lincoln City, Oregon, United States
|
|-
|Win
|align=center| 6–0
|Mauricio Diaz
|Submission (heel hook)
|KOTC: Energetic Pursuit
|
|align=center| 1
|align=center| 2:14
|Ontario, California, United States
|
|-
|Win
|align=center| 5–0
|Zane Douglas
|Submission (rear-naked choke)
|KOTC: Never Quit
|
|align=center|1
|align=center|1:37
|Ontario, California, United States
| 
|-
|Win
|align=center|4–0
|Musa Toliver
|Submission (armbar)
|KOTC: Supernova
|
|align=center|1
|align=center|3:23
|Ontario, California, United States
|
|-
|Win
|align=center|3–0
|Gor Mnatsakanyan
|TKO (punches)
|KOTC: Martial Law
|
|align=center|1
|align=center|4:39
|Ontario, California, United States
|
|-
|Win
|align=center|2–0
|Carlos Galvan
|Decision (unanimous)
|KOTC: Sinister Intentions
|
|align=center|3
|align=center|5:00
|Las Vegas, Nevada, United States
|
|-
|Win
|align=center|1–0
|Jesus Rivas
|Submission (armbar)
|KOTC: Bitter Rivals
|
|align=center|1
|align=center|1:43
|Ontario, California, United States
|

See also 
 List of current UFC fighters
 List of male mixed martial artists

References

External links 
  
 

1993 births
Living people
American male mixed martial artists
Bantamweight mixed martial artists
Mixed martial artists utilizing Brazilian jiu-jitsu
Ultimate Fighting Championship male fighters
American practitioners of Brazilian jiu-jitsu
People awarded a black belt in Brazilian jiu-jitsu